WDIG may refer to:

 Walt Disney Internet Group
 WDIG (AM), a radio station (1450 AM) licensed to serve Dothan, Alabama, United States
 WIXZ, a radio station (950 AM) licensed to serve Steubenville, Ohio, United States, which held the call sign WDIG from 1987 to 2018
 Wdig is the Welsh-language name for the community of Goodwick in Wales